Ida Forsyne (January 1, 1883 – August 19, 1983), sometimes seen as Ida Forcen, was an African-American vaudeville dancer who toured in Europe and Russia before World War I. Professionally she was known as the 'Queen of the Cakewalk'.

Early life
Ida Forsyne was born on South Side, Chicago, Illinois in 1883, and raised by her mother. The family lived across the street from the Alhambra Theater so Forsyne would watch shows from the fire escape, she recalled in an article in 1953. By age 14, Forsyne ran away to join a tab show called the Black Bostonians Coon Town 400. She sang a lullaby called "Drowsy Babe" as a duet with performer Rosie Grayson. Forsyne was stranded in Montana when the show ran out of money, and her mother arranged for her and one other performer to be sent home.

Career
In 1898, at age 15, Forsyne joined Sissieretta Jones in Black Patti's Troubadours when they were in Chicago, as a dancer. She next worked in shows in New York and New Jersey.

She was part of the Smart Set Company in 1902, which was an all Black show with a White producer, Gus Hill. She was in the cast of Darktown's Circus Day in 1903, and by 1904 had a solo act in The Southerners, the first interracial musical show, headed by Will Marion Cook. In 1906, she was featured with the Tennessee Students, and with them toured Europe, sometimes billed as "Topsy." Forsyne was the billing star with her picture on the front of the program. In London at the Alhambra Theater, Forsyne introduced her sack dance, in which she danced in a potato sack in front of a chorus line of ballet dancers in blackface.

When returning from a tour in London, she accepted an offer from the Marinelli Agency that would last nine years non-stop. During those nine years she found the most success. She performed at the Moulin Rouge and even for the Royal Family. She received critical acclaim abroad.

An energetic version of the kazatsky dance was her specialty, which she developed during a run in Moscow, in 1911. "I stole all the steps I could. I liked Russian dancing so much as I wanted to be different than most colored performers," she recalled. and was hailed the "greatest Russian dancer of them all." Although Russian style dancing was done before her in the United States’ vaudeville circuit, Forsyne brought it to the forefront.

She stayed abroad until just before World War I in 1914. Langston Hughes considered her one of the dozen best dancers in Harlem.

By the time she was back in the United States, she was in her thirties, her Russian dancing quickly went out of style. and Forsyne found it difficult to gain dance jobs. In addition to age, she believed her darker skintone was a barrier to employment, even in all-black shows, what she called "Black prejudice."

From 1920 to 1922, Forsyne worked as a personal maid, both onstage and off stage to vaudeville performer, Sophie Tucker. At the end of Tucker’s performances, Forsyne would come out as a dancer to drum up applause. New rules on the Keith Circuit prohibited Black performers to appear on stage with White performers unless they were in Blackface. Additionally no Black performer was allowed to watch the show. Tucker refused to have Forsyne perform in Blackface but did allow her to watch the show from the wings.

In 1924, she returned to the Theatre Owners Booking Association Black vaudeville circuit. On returning to New York, Forsyne auditioned but was not hired at Harlem nightclubs such as the Cotton Club, Connie’s Inn, and the Nest because of their preference for light-skinned chorus girls. She also did not approve of scantily-clad costumes. he traveled with Mamie Smith in 1924, Dusty Fletcher in 1925, and Bessie Smith in 1928. On the circuit with Bessie Smith she earned $35 a week and was able to reprise some of her Russian dances. She left in 1928 and vowed never to tour the South again.

Although she quit dancing in the early 1930s and worked as a domestic servant and elevator operator, she did appear in a few films, including A Daughter of the Congo an Oscar Micheaux movie Birthright in 1935, and the 1936 film, The Green Pastures. There was a birthday tribute event to Ida Forsyne in 1955, which allowed her to show off her dance skills in her seventies. In the 1960s, Forsyne was interviewed by oral historians of dance, Marshall Stearns and Jean Stearns.

Contributions
In 1951, Forsyne assisted Ruthanna Boris in the choreography of the New York City Ballet’s "Cakewalk," by George Balanchine.

Personal life
Her cousin Ollie Burgoyne was also a dancer in vaudeville shows and on Broadway, who also toured extensively overseas. They appeared together in a 1919 show, They're Off.  Forsyne was active with the Negro Actors Guild in her later years.

Forsyne had three husbands: James Frank Dougherty, Usher Henry Watts and Arthur Belton Hubbard.

Ida Forsyne died at age 100, in a nursing home in Brooklyn, New York.

References

Lori Harrison-Kahan, The White Negress: Literature, Minstrelsy, and the Black-Jewish Imaginary (Rutgers University Press 2011): 35.

External links
Ida Forsyne, "Ida Forsyne Remembers When Talent Helped in Show Business" New York Age (August 22, 1953): 7. via Newspapers.com 

1883 births
1983 deaths
African-American female dancers
African-American dancers
Vaudeville performers
American female dancers
Dancers from Illinois
People from Chicago
20th-century American dancers
20th-century African-American women
20th-century African-American people